Olonne-sur-Mer (literally Olonne on Sea) is a former commune in the Vendée department in the Pays de la Loire region in western France. On 1 January 2019, it was merged into the commune Les Sables-d'Olonne. It is home to the basketball team Pays des Olonnes Basket, which plays its home games at the Salle Beauséjour.

See also
Communes of the Vendée department

References

External links

Official site

Former communes of Vendée
Populated coastal places in France